The Exhibition Ground is a cricket ground in Eluru, Andhra Pradesh, India.  The ground first held a single first-class match in 1976 when Andhra Pradesh played Hyderabad in the 1976/77 Ranji Trophy, which ended in a draw.

References

External links
Exhibition Ground at ESPNcricinfo
Exhibition Ground at CricketArchive

Cricket grounds in Andhra Pradesh
Sports venues in Eluru
Buildings and structures in West Godavari district
1976 establishments in Andhra Pradesh
Sports venues completed in 1976
20th-century architecture in India